This is a list of player transfers involving Premiership Rugby teams before or during the 2023–24 season.

The list consists of deals that have been confirmed, and are for players who are moving either from or to a rugby union team which competed in the Premiership during the 2022–23 season. Transfers involving the winner of the 2022–23 RFU Championship would also be included, subject to that club fulfilling the minimum eligibility criteria to achieve promotion into the Premiership. It is not unknown for confirmed deals to be cancelled at a later date.

Transfers involving Wasps and Worcester Warriors are not included on this list, following the suspension of both clubs partway through the 2022–23 season due to financial insolvency, and their subsequent relegation to the Championship for the 2023–24 season, after their appeals were rejected by the RFU.

Bath

Players In 
  Finn Russell from  Racing 92

Players Out

Bristol Bears

Players In 
 Max Malins from  Saracens
 Kalaveti Ravouvou from  Fijian Drua
 Kieran Marmion from  Connacht

Players Out 
 Joe Joyce to  Connacht 
 Will Porter to  Harlequins
 Semi Radradra to  Lyon
 Sam Bedlow to  Sale Sharks 
 Andy Uren to  Benetton
 Charles Piutau released

Exeter Chiefs

Players In

Players Out 
 Sam Simmonds to  Montpellier 
 Luke Cowan-Dickie to  Montpellier 
 Jannes Kirsten to  Bulls 
 Dave Ewers to  Ulster 
 Joe Simmonds to  Pau 
 Harry Williams to  Montpellier

Gloucester

Players In 
 Zach Mercer from  Montpellier
 Max Llewellyn from  Cardiff

Players Out 
 Tom Seabrook to  Northampton Saints
 Finn Theobald-Thomas to  Leicester Tigers
 Ben Morgan retiring 
 Jake Polledri to  Zebre Parma

Harlequins

Players In 
 Joe Launchbury from  Toyota Verblitz 
 Will Porter from  Bristol Bears

Players Out 
 Wilco Louw to  Bulls 
 Joe Marchant to  Stade Français 
 Tommaso Allan to  Perpignan 
 Josh Bassett to  Leicester Tigers

Leicester Tigers

Players In 
 Josh Bassett from  Harlequins 
  Kyle Hatherell from  La Rochelle
  Jamie Shillcock from  Mitsubishi DynaBoars
  Finn Theobald-Thomas from  Gloucester

Players Out
 Sean Jansen to  Connacht

London Irish

Players In

Players Out 
 Tom Parton to  Saracens
 Rob Simmons to  Clermont

Newcastle Falcons

Players In 
 Murray McCallum from  Edinburgh 
 Kiran McDonald from  Munster
 Tim Cardall from  Melbourne Rebels

Players Out
  Gary Graham to  Carcassonne

Northampton Saints

Players In 
 Curtis Langdon from  Montpellier
 Burger Odendaal from  Toshiba Brave Lupus Tokyo
 Tom Seabrook from  Gloucester
 Temo Mayanavanua from  Lyon

Players Out 
 David Ribbans to  Toulon
 Mike Haywood retiring

Sale Sharks

Players In 
 Sam Bedlow from  Bristol Bears

Players Out

Saracens

Players In 
 Tom Parton from  London Irish
 Tom Willis from  Bordeaux
 Gareth Simpson from  Western Force

Players Out 
 Max Malins to  Bristol Bears
 Robin Hislop to  Edinburgh

See also 
 List of 2023–24 United Rugby Championship transfers
 List of 2023–24 RFU Championship transfers
 List of 2023–24 Super Rugby transfers
 List of 2023–24 Top 14 transfers
 List of 2023–24 Rugby Pro D2 transfers
 List of 2023–24 Major League Rugby transfers

References 

2023-24
transfers